Gantt may refer to:
Henry Gantt, American mechanical engineer and management consultant, known for his work in the development of scientific management and creator of the Gantt chart
 Gantt chart, a type of bar chart that illustrates a project schedule and estimation
 Gantt (surname)
 Gantt, Alabama, United States
 Gantt, South Carolina, United States

See also
 Gant (disambiguation)
 Gantz (disambiguation)